UniCredit Bank Czech Republic and Slovakia a.s., is a Czech and Slovak bank based in Prague, the capital of the Czech Republic. The bank was a subsidiary of Italy-based UniCredit Group for 99.96% stake.

History
UniCredit Bank Czech Republic and Slovakia a.s. was founded on 1 December 2013 by UniCredit Bank Czech Republic a.s. absorbed Slovak sister company UniCredit Bank Slovakia a.s. UniCredit Bank Czech Republic itself was founded on 1 October 2006 by the merger of HVB Bank Czech Republic a.s. and Živnostenská banka a.s.

The parent company of HVB Bank Czech Republic, German bank HypoVereinsbank (HVB) was acquired by UniCredit Group in 2005. HypoVereinsbank's subsidiary, Bank Austria (aka UniCredit Bank Austria), was the direct parent company of UniCredit Bank Czech Republic and Slovakia until September 2016. In September 2016 UniCredit S.p.A., the ultimate parent company, acquired the whole Central and Eastern Europe division from subsidiary Bank Austria.

References

External links
 

Banks of the Czech Republic
Banks of Slovakia
UniCredit subsidiaries
Companies based in Prague
Banks established in 2006
Czech companies established in 2006
Czech companies established in 2013
Banks established in 2013